Jorge Mejía (born 6 July 1952) is an Ecuadorian boxer. He competed in the men's flyweight event at the 1972 Summer Olympics.

References

1952 births
Living people
Ecuadorian male boxers
Olympic boxers of Ecuador
Boxers at the 1972 Summer Olympics
Place of birth missing (living people)
Flyweight boxers
20th-century Ecuadorian people